Archdiocese (Metropolitan) of Huế is a Roman Catholic Archdiocese in central Vietnam.

The creation of the diocese in its present form was declared on 24 November 1960. It covers an area of 12,227 km² and headed by Archbishop Joseph Nguyễn Chí Linh (from 2016), who was previously the Bishop of Thanh Hóa.

The suffragan dioceses are: 
 Diocese of Ban Mê Thuôt
 Diocese of Đà Nẵng
 Diocese of Kontum
 Diocese of Nha Trang
 Diocese of Quy Nhơn.

Immaculate Heart of Mary Cathedral in Huế has been assigned as the Cathedral of the Archdiocese.

By 2004, the Archdiocese of Huế had about 65,770 Roman Catholics (3.3% of the population), 93 priests and 177 parishes.

Ordinaries
François Pellerin, MEP, 1850–62
Joseph Sohier, MEP, 1862–76
Jean Pontvianne, MEP, 1877–79
Louis Caspar, MEP, 1880–1907
Eugène Allys, MEP, 1908-1931
Alexandre Chabanon, MEP, 1931–36
François Lemasle, MEP, 1936–46
Jean-Baptiste Urrutia, MEP, 1948–60
Pierre Martin Ngô Đình Thục, 1960–68
Philippe Nguyên-Kim-Diên, 1968–88
Vacant (1988–98)
Stephen (Étienne) Nguyễn Như Thể, 1998–2012
Francis Xavier Lê Văn Hồng, 2012–2016
Joseph Nguyễn Chí Linh, 2016–present

References

External links
  

Huế
Roman Catholic dioceses in Vietnam
Christian organizations established in 1960
Roman Catholic dioceses and prelatures established in the 20th century
Roman Catholic ecclesiastical provinces in Vietnam
 
1960 establishments in South Vietnam